Gerald Alfano Mayhew (born December 31, 1992) is an American professional ice hockey winger who is currently playing with the Charlotte Checkers in the American Hockey League (AHL) while under contract with the Florida Panthers of the National Hockey League (NHL).

Early life 
Mayhew was born on December 31, 1992, in Wyandotte, Michigan, to Gerald and Catherine Mayhew. He grew up about 20 minutes outside of Detroit and Joe Louis Arena, and would frequently attend Detroit Red Wings games through his childhood. Mayhew's favorite ice hockey players were Steve Yzerman and Brett Hull. Unlike many youth hockey players in Michigan, Mayhew declined the opportunity to play minor ice hockey for the Little Caesars program, preferring instead to focus on his school team. He attended Roosevelt High School in Wyandotte, leading their ice hockey team to a state championship in 2011. That year, he scored 48 goals and 57 assists and was crowned Michigan's "Mr. Hockey", an award given to the top boys' ice hockey player in the state.

Playing career
Mayhew attended high school at Theodore Roosevelt High School (Michigan) where he won the 2011 Michigan High School Athletic Association ice hockey state championship.  Undrafted, Mayhew would play four years of university hockey with the Ferris State Bulldogs of the Western Collegiate Hockey Association before turning professional by signing an amateur tryout agreement with the Iowa Wild of the American Hockey League on March 9, 2017. Mayhew played the remainder of the 2016–17 season with the Wild, scoring six goals and seven points in 17 appearances with the club before being inked to an AHL contract for the following season. After being re-signed for another season, Mayhew put up 60 points in 71 games, and was rewarded with a two-year, two-way contract by the Minnesota Wild, Iowa's National Hockey League affiliate, on May 10, 2019.

After putting up six points in the first four games of the 2019–20 AHL season, Mayhew was called up by the Wild on October 13. He made his NHL debut on October 15, scoring a goal in a 4–2 loss against the Toronto Maple Leafs.

Leaving the Wild organization after five seasons, Mayhew was signed as a free agent to a one-year, two-way $800,000 contract with the Philadelphia Flyers on July 28, 2021. Starting the  season with AHL affiliate, the Lehigh Valley Phantoms, Mayhew collected 9 goals in 24 games. Recalled to the NHL, Mayhew featured in 25 games for the struggling Flyers, recording a career best 6 goals, before he was claimed off waivers by the Anaheim Ducks on March 20, 2022.

On July 15, 2022, Mayhew was signed as a free agent to a one-year, two-way contract with the Florida Panthers.

Career statistics

Awards and honors

References

External links
 

1992 births
American men's ice hockey forwards
Anaheim Ducks players
Cedar Rapids RoughRiders players
Charlotte Checkers (2010–) players
Ferris State Bulldogs men's ice hockey players
Ice hockey players from Michigan
Iowa Wild players
Lehigh Valley Phantoms players
Living people
Minnesota Wild players
People from Wyandotte, Michigan
Philadelphia Flyers players
Undrafted National Hockey League players